Le Val-d'Ocre is a commune in the Yonne department of central France. The municipality was established on 1 January 2016 by merger of the former communes of Saint-Aubin-Château-Neuf and Saint-Martin-sur-Ocre.

See also 
Communes of the Yonne department

References 

Communes of Yonne